MySims SkyHeroes is a video game developed by Behaviour Interactive and published by Electronic Arts. It is the sixth and final game in the MySims series. The game was released on September 28, 2010, for the Nintendo DS, PlayStation 3, Wii, and Xbox 360.

Gameplay
MySims SkyHeroes is an aviation game that features a solo campaign, boss battles, local co-op, and online multiplayer. There are upgrades for the planes through a plane editor which will allow players to customize a plane using parts like wings and engines acquired by completing missions. Some upgrades are purely decorative, like wheel styles, but wing, engine and body upgrades upgrade stats using a three star rating system.

Multiplayer
The multiplayer modes available are racing and battle modes. In multi-player, users which have a game profile will be able to use their saved planes and avatars.

Plot
The player starts out as an unknown pilot and leads the resistance to the evil Morcubus and his drones who plan to take over the skyways. The player will have to team up with NPCs to defeat Morcubus and his Chaos Pirates. This game introduces new characters Dragomir and Svetlana as the Chaos Pirates' top pilots.

Reception

The game received mixed reviews among critics. IGN gave the Xbox 360 version a score of 7.0 commenting on the game's high quality graphics. IGN also gave the Wii version a 7.0, commenting on the game's simple controls but felt that the game has nothing really special about it. "The story mode is missing the clever writing that was enjoyed in some of the previous MySims games, and the lack of variety in the missions makes most of them feel like a chore". "Multiplayer can be fun, but it's not doing anything we haven't seen before". IGN gave the DS version a score of just 5.0 commenting that MySims SkyHeroes is oddly more complicated and way less fun than the console versions. The punishing gameplay takes away from what could have been a really fun multiplayer experience. GameSpot gave the Xbox 360 version a score of 4.5.

References

2010 video games
Flight simulation video games
Electronic Arts games
Nintendo DS games
Xbox 360 games
The Sims
Wii games
PlayStation 3 games
Behaviour Interactive games
Video games developed in Canada